The Westermarck effect, also known as reverse sexual imprinting, is a psychological hypothesis that states that people tend not to be attracted to peers with whom they lived like siblings before age six. This hypothesis was first proposed by Finnish anthropologist Edvard Westermarck in his book The History of Human Marriage (1891) as one explanation for the incest taboo.

Research since Westermarck 
The Westermarck effect has achieved some empirical support. Proponents point to evidence from the Israeli kibbutz system, from the Chinese Shim-pua marriage customs, and from closely related families.

In the case of the Israeli kibbutzim (collective farms), children were reared somewhat communally in peer groups, based on age, not biological relations. A study of the marriage patterns of these children later in life revealed that out of the nearly 3,000 marriages that occurred across the kibbutz system, only 14 were between children from the same peer group. Of those 14, none had been reared together during the first six years of life. This result suggests that the Westermarck effect operates during the period from birth to the age of six.

In Shim-pua marriages, a girl would be adopted into a family as the future wife of a son, often an infant at that time. These marriages often failed, as would be expected according to the Westermarck hypothesis.

Studies show that cousin-marriage in Lebanon has a lower success rate if the cousins were raised in sibling-like conditions, first-cousin unions being more successful in Pakistan if there was a substantial age difference, as well as reduced marital appeal for cousins who grew up sleeping in the same room in Morocco. Evidence also indicates that siblings separated for extended periods of time since childhood were more likely to report having engaged in sexual activity with one another.

Criticism 
Eran Shor and Dalit Simchai revisited the kibbutzim results and found sexual attraction where it hadn't been acted on. They conclude that any innate aversion needs to be backed up by social pressures and norms.

See also 
Accidental incest
Genetic sexual attraction
Kibbutz communal child rearing and collective education
Oedipus complex

References

Further reading 
 
 
 
  Vol. 1; Vol. 2; Vol. 3.

Child development
Evolutionary psychology
Incest
Sexual attraction
Sibling